Harirhat  is a small town cum village area and it is also a market place in the Dhubri District (Assam). In addition, it is located in an ancient place called "the Village of Purni." The panchayat office is located at Purni Gaon (Harirhat Gaon Panchayat)

About

Harirhat is a village council located in the subdivision of Golakganj Dhubri district of Assam, India. The latitude is 26.3170969 and longitude is 89.6976093999999. Dispur is the state capital of Harirhat village (Purni). It is located around 214.0 kilometers away from Harirhat. The other nearest state capital is Gangtok, which is 156.8 km from Harirhat. The other surrounding state capitals are Shillong (232.6 km) and Agartala (317.7 km). The Harirhat village is located in the UTC 5.30 time zone and follows Indian standard time (IST). Harirhat sun rise times varies by -30 minutes from IST. In Harirhat, all drivers drive on the left hand side of the road. Harirhat uses the Indian national currency which is Indian Rupee and its international currency code is INR. Harirhat phones and mobiles can be accessed by adding the Indian country dialing code +91 from abroad.

Nearest Railway Stations

Nearby Rail stations are located in Agomani, Golakganj, Dhubri, and Bongaigaon.

Nearest Towns

The closest towns are Dhubri, Gauripur, Golakganj, Agomani and Coochbeehar.

Nearest Airport

The closest one and only airport is Rupsi Airport, The distance between airport to Harirhat is around 12Km.

Nearby Schools
Nearby schools are located in Harirhat bazaar M.E School (Harirhat Bazar), Kachakhana Higher Secondary School, Kachakhana M.V school), and Shankar Dev Shishu Niketan Kachakhna (Purni).

Villages in Dhubri district